Egypt competed at the 1948 Summer Olympics in London, England. 85 competitors, all men, took part in 53 events in 12 sports.

Medalists

Gold
 Ibrahim Shams — Weightlifting, Lightweight
 Mahmoud Fayad - Weightlifting, Featherweight

Silver
 Attia Hamouda — Weightlifting, Lightweight
 Mahmoud Hassan — Wrestling, Greco-Roman Bantamweight

Bronze
 Ibrahim Orabi — Wrestling, Greco-Roman Light Heavyweight

Athletics

Basketball

Boxing

Diving

Fencing

Nine fencers, all men, represented Egypt in 1948.

Men's foil
 Osman Abdel Hafeez
 Hassan Hosni Tawfik
 Mahmoud Younes

Men's team foil
 Osman Abdel Hafeez, Salah Dessouki, Mahmoud Younes, Mohamed Zulficar, Hassan Hosni Tawfik, Mahmoud Abdin

Men's épée
 Mahmoud Younes
 Jean Asfar
 Mohamed Abdel Rahman

Men's team épée
 Salah Dessouki, Jean Asfar, Mahmoud Younes, Mohamed Abdel Rahman, Osman Abdel Hafeez

Men's sabre
 Salah Dessouki
 Ahmed Abou-Shadi
 Mohamed Zulficar

Men's team sabre
 Salah Dessouki, Mohamed Zulficar, Mahmoud Younes, Ahmed Abou-Shadi

Football

Gymnastics

Rowing

Egypt had one male rowers participate in one out of seven rowing events in 1948.

 Men's single sculls
 Mohamed El-Sayed

Swimming

Water polo

Weightlifting

Wrestling

References

Nations at the 1948 Summer Olympics
1948
Olympics